Salcia Landmann, born Salcia Passweg (18 November 1911 – 16 May 2002), was a Jewish writer. She was born in Zhovkva, Galicia, and died in St. Gallen, Switzerland. She worked on preserving the Yiddish language, and she wrote the important work Der Jüdische Witz (Jewish Humor). She was one of the founders of the International PEN in Liechtenstein. She had one son and was married to philosopher Michael Landmann since 1939.

1911 births
2002 deaths
People from Zhovkva
Jewish Ukrainian writers
Swiss writers
Jews from Galicia (Eastern Europe)
Polish emigrants to Switzerland
Ukrainian women writers
Jewish women writers
People from St. Gallen (city)

There IS already a good article on her in the German Wikipedia: 
https://de.wikipedia.org/wiki/Salcia_Landmann